International Association of Meteorology and Atmospheric Sciences (IAMAS) is a non-governmental organization aimed to promote and advance a number of atmospheric sciences through conferences, workshops and publications. IAMAS and its commissions bring together experts from around the world to enhance scientific understanding and prediction of the atmosphere’s behavior and its connections to and effects on other components of the Earth’s geophysical system. IAMAS is one of eight associations of the International Union of Geodesy and Geophysics (IUGG). It was created at the First IUGG General Assembly in 1922 as the Meteorology Section and was renamed to International Association and of Meteorology in 1957. Since 1993, it holds its current name – the International Association of Meteorology and Atmospheric Sciences.

IAMAS Commissions 
IAMAS consists of ten commissions:

 The International Commission on Atmospheric Chemistry and Global Pollution (iCACGP)
 The International Commission on Atmospheric Electricity (ICAE)
 The International Commission on Climate (ICCL)
 The International Commission on Clouds and Precipitation (ICCP)
 The International Commission on Dynamical Meteorology (ICDM)
 The International Commission on the Middle Atmosphere (ICMA)
 The International Commission on Planetary Atmospheres and their Evolution (ICPAE)
 The International Commission on Polar Meteorology (ICPM)
 The International Ozone Commission (IOC)
 The International Radiation Commission (IRC)

IAMAS Management 
Bureau, guided by the IAMAS statutes, deals with the management of the organization. The Bureau is responsible to the Executive Committee. The President of IAMAS since 2019 is Joyce Penner, USA. Steve Ackerman, USA, is a current IAMAS-Secretary-General.

Early Career Scientist Medal Award 
IAMAS Early Career Scientist Medal Award was established in 2011, and is presented every two years, from the candidates nominated by the commissions of IAMAS. Lei Bi, from Department of Atmospheric Sciences School of Earth Sciences, Zhejiang University, was awarded the 2019 IAMAS Early Career Scientist Medal.

References 

Meteorological societies
Members of the International Council for Science
Scientific organizations based in Europe
Atmospheric sciences organizations